Aage is a Danish masculine given name and a less common spelling of the Norwegian given name Åge. Variants include the Swedish name Åke. People with the name Aage include:

First name
Count Aage of Rosenborg (1887–1940), Danish prince and officer of the French Foreign Legion
Aage Bendixen (1887–1973), Danish actor
Aage Berntsen (1885–1952), Danish Olympic fencer, doctor writer and artist
Aage Bertelsen (1873–1945), Danish painter
Aage Birch (1926–2017), Danish sailor
Aage Bohr (1922–2009), Danish nuclear physicist and Nobel laureate, son of Niels Bohr
Aage Borchgrevink (born 1969), Norwegian writer and literary critic
Aage Brix (1894–1963), American soccer player
Aage Dons (1903–1993), Danish writer
Aage Emborg (1883–1953), Danish composer
Aage Eriksen (1917-1998), Norwegian wrestler and Olympic medallist in Greco-Roman wrestling
Aage Fønss (1887–1976), Danish opera singer and actor
Aage Fahrenholtz (1901–1990), Danish boxer
Aage Foss (1885–1952), Danish film actor
Aage Frandsen (1890–1968), Danish gymnast
Aage Friis (1870–1949), Danish historian and professor
Aage Giødesen (1863–1939), Danish painter
Aage Grundstad (1923–2012), Norwegian accordion player
Aage Høy-Petersen (1898–1967), Danish sailor
Aage Hansen (born 1935), Norwegian speedway rider
Aage Haugland (1944–2000), Danish operatic bass
Aage Heimann (1900–1956), Danish field hockey player
Aage Hermann (1888–1949), Danish author and journalist
Aage Hertel (1873–1944), Danish actor
Aage Ingerslev (1933–2003), Danish chess player
Aage Jørgensen (gymnast) (1900–1972), Danish gymnast
Aage Jørgensen (1903–1967), Danish footballer
Aage Jepsen Sparre (1460–1540), Danish priest, archbishop of Lund 1523–1532
Aage Jensen (1915–1995), Danish coxswain
Aage Rou Jensen (1924–2009), Danish footballer
Aage Kirkegaard (1914–1992), Danish field hockey player
Aage Kjelstrup, Norwegian racing cyclist
Aage Krarup Nielsen (1891–1972), travel writer
Aage Kvalbein (born 1947), Norwegian cellist and a professor in cello at the Norwegian Academy of Music
Aage Langeland-Mathiesen (1868–1933), Danish architect
Aage Larsen (1923–2016), Danish rower
Aage Leidersdorff (1910–1970), Danish Olympic fencer
Aage Lundvald (1908–1983), Danish illustrator, cartoonist, and composer
Aage Møller (born 1932), American professor of cognition and neuroscience
Aage Møst (1923–2011), Norwegian journalist and sports official
Aage Madsen (1883–1937), Danish tennis player
Aage Marius Hansen (1890–1980), Danish gymnast
Aage Meyer (1904–1979), Danish wrestler
Aage Myhrvold (1918–1987), Norwegian cyclist
Aage Neutzsky-Wulff (1891–1967), Danish writer and poet
Aage Nielsen-Edwin (1898–1985), Danish sculptor
Aage Oxenvad (1884–1944), Danish clarinettist
Aage Poulsen (1919–1998), Danish long-distance runner
Aage Rasmussen (1889–1983), Danish photographer and track and field athlete
Aage Redal (1891–1950), Danish stage and film actor
Aage Rou Jensen (1924–2009), Danish international footballer
Aage Roussel (1901–1972), Danish archaeologist and historian
Aage Rubæk-Nielsen (1913–1990), Danish equestrian
Aage Rundberget (born 1947), Norwegian judge and civil servant
Aage B. Sørensen (1941–2001), Danish sociologist
Aage Samuelsen (1915–1987), Norwegian evangelist, singer and composer
Aage Schavland (1806–1876), Norwegian priest and Member of Parliament
Aage Skavlan (1847–1920), Norwegian historian
Aage Steen (1900–1982), Norwegian boxer
Aage Stentoft (1914–1990), Danish composer, film score composer and theatre director
Aage Storstein (1900–1983), Norwegian artist
Aage Tanggaard (born 1957), Danish jazz drummer and record producer
Aage Teigen (1944–2014), Norwegian jazz musician and economist
Aage Thaarup (1906–1987), Danish milliner
Aage Thor Falkanger (born 1965), Norwegian judge and legal scholar
Aage Thor Falkanger Sr. (1902–1981), Norwegian judge
Aage Thordal-Christensen (born 1965), Danish dancer, choreographer, and ballet director
Aage Torgensen (1900–1932), Danish wrestler
Aage Vestøl (1922–2008), Norwegian chess player
Aage Walther (1897–1961), Danish gymnast
Aage William Søgaard (1933–2010), Norwegian trade unionist and politician
Aage Winther-Jørgensen (1900–1967), Danish actor

Middle name
Bjørn Aage Ibsen (1915–2007), Danish anesthetist and founder of intensive-care medicine
Carl Aage Hilbert (1899–1953), Danish Prefect of the Faroe Islands 1936–1945
Kai Aage Bruun (1899–1971), Danish music writer, critic and composer
Kaj Aage Gunnar Strand (1907–2000), Danish astronomer who worked in Denmark and the U.S.A.
Karl Aage Hansen (1921–1990), Danish football player
Karl Aage Præst (1922-2011), Danish football player
Karl Aage Rasmussen (born 1947), Danish composer, writer and organizer
Knud Aage Nielsen, (born 1937), Danish badminton player
Nils Aage Jegstad (born 1950), Norwegian politician for the Conservative Party
Per Aage Brandt (1944–2021), Danish writer, poet, and linguist
Svend Aage Castella (1890–1938), Danish amateur football (soccer) player
Svend Aage Jensby (born 1940), Danish politician representing the Liberal Party
Svend Aage Madsen (born 1939), Danish novelist
Svend Aage Rask (1935–2020), Danish footballer
Tom Aage Aarnes (born 1977), Norwegian ski jumper

See also
Aage Badho (English translation - March Ahead), 1947 Hindi-language Movie directed by Yeshwant Pithkar
Aage Kadam (English translation - Forward March), 1943 Hindi-language black-and-white Movie directed by N R Acharya
Aage Ki Soch, 1988 Hindi language movie directed by Dada Kondke
Aage Kya, 2021 Indian interactive quiz show

Danish masculine given names
Norwegian masculine given names

es:Aage
no:Aage
sv:Aage